The 2008 season was the 112th completed season of the Australian Football League (AFL), the highest-level  Australian rules football competition in Australia. There were 84 players who first participated in an AFL premiership match during the 2008 season. The regular season commenced on 20 March and concluded with the AFL Grand Final on 27 September, where the premiership was won by Hawthorn. This year celebrated the 150th anniversary of the establishment of Australian football as a sport in 1858.

The premiership season is inclusive of home-and-away and finals series matches only, and does not include pre-season matches or representative games (such as State of Origin or International rules football). Of those making their AFL debut, there were 17 rookie-listed players who were elevated to their clubs' senior list during the season. Rookie players receive a reduced salary in comparison to senior-listed players, and are not necessarily automatically eligible for selection in games, unless they are elevated.

In addition to those players making their debuts, there were 25 players who played their first game with a new AFL club after previously having played with another club in the league. Notably, former West Coast captain Chris Judd played his first game for Carlton in the first round of the season, after being traded in the preceding off-season. Cyril Rioli played every game for Hawthorn in the 2008 season, playing a total of 25 games (including the Grand Final)—the most of any debut player that year. Jack Anthony scored the most goals out of first-year players in 2008, attaining 25 goals in his 12 matches.

Summary

Debuts

Change of clubs

See also 
 2008 AFL season

References

Bibliography 
 

Australian rules football records and statistics
Australian rules football-related lists
2008 in Australian rules football
2008 Australian Football League season